Provinces are one of the first-level divisions within South Korea. There are 9 provinces in South Korea: North Chungcheong, South Chungcheong, Gangwon, Gyeonggi, North Gyeongsang, South Gyeongsang, North Jeolla, South Jeolla, and Jeju Special Self-Governing Province.

History

Although the details of local administration have changed dramatically over time, the basic outline of the current three-tiered system was implemented under the reign of Gojong in 1895. A similar system also remains in use in North Korea.

Types
Provinces are the highest-ranked administrative divisions in South Korea, which follows the East Asian tradition name Circuit (administrative division). Along with the common provinces, there are four types of special administrative divisions with equal status: special self-governing province, special city, metropolitan city, and special self-governing city.

A special self-governing province is a province with more autonomy over its economy and more powers are given to the provincial government. Jeju is the only special self-governing province, while Seoul is the only special city and Sejong is the only special self-governing city.

Administration
Governors for the provinces and mayors for the special/metropolitan cities are elected every four years. Current governors and mayors are listed at List of governors of South Korea.

List of provinces

Claimed provinces

South Korea claims five provinces on the territory controlled by North Korea. These claimed provinces are managed by the Committee for the Five Northern Korean Provinces. These provinces are based on the divisions of the Japanese era and are different from the present North Korean provinces.

See also
 Administrative divisions of South Korea
 Special cities of South Korea

References

 
Provinces, Korea S
Lists of subdivisions of South Korea